The New England Governors and Eastern Canadian Premiers (NEG-ECP) Climate Change Action Plan 2001 is a resolution adopted on August 28, 2001, by the New England Governors and the Eastern Canadian Premiers. The resolution calls for a reduction in  greenhouse gas (GHG) emissions to 1990 levels by 2010, at least 10% below 1990 levels by 2020, 35-45% below 1990 levels by 2030, and a 75-85% reduction of 2001 levels by 2050.

Participating are the six states belonging to New England: Connecticut, Maine, Massachusetts, New Hampshire, Rhode Island, and Vermont; as well as the Eastern Canadian provinces: New Brunswick, Newfoundland and Labrador, Nova Scotia, Prince Edward Island, and Quebec.

In addition, the Northeast States for Coordinated Air Use Management (NESCAUM) is building a Regional Greenhouse Gas Registry (RGGR) to help track emissions in the region.  This effort is similar to that of the California Climate Action Registry.

History

The drafting of the action plan began when the NEG-ECP adopted the Resolution Concerning Global Warming and its Impacts on the Environment (Resolution 25-9) on July 16–18, 2000. It addresses that "global warming, given its harmful consequences to the environment and the economy, is a joint concern for which a regional approach to strategic action is required."

Action items

The Action Plan outlines nine major action items, designed to aid the participating states in meeting committed goals:

Action Item 1: The Establishment of a Regional Standardized GHG Emissions Inventory
Action Item 2: The Establishment of a Plan for Reducing GHG Emissions and Conserving Energy
Action Item 3: The Promotion of Public Awareness
Action Item 4: State and Provincial Governments to Lead by Example
Action Item 5: The Reduction of Greenhouse Gases from the Electricity Sector
Action Item 6: The Reduction of the Total Energy Demand Through Conservation
Action Item 7: The Reduction and/or Adaptation of Negative Social, Economic and Environmental Impacts of Climate Change
Action Item 8: A Decrease in the Transportation Sector's Growth in GHG Emissions
Action Item 9: The Creation of a Regional Emissions Registry and the Exploration of a Trading Mechanism

Later developments

The New England states later began participating in the Regional Greenhouse Gas Initiative to regulate greenhouse gas emissions from electricity generation.

Canada's carbon tax has since been applied to all Canadian provinces and territories.

See also

 Climate change in Canada
 Climate change in the United States
 Climate Stewardship Bill
 The Climate Registry
 Western Regional Climate Action Initiative
 Midwestern Greenhouse Gas Reduction Accord
 List of climate change initiatives

References

External links
 New England Governors and Eastern Canadian Premiers (NEG-ECP) Climate Change Action Plan 2001
 New England Governors' Conference, Inc.
 New England Climate Coalition
 State Climate Action Plan Fact Sheet

Canada–United States relations
Climate change in the United States
Climate change in Canada
Action plans